Bertkauia lepicidinaria is a species of elliptical barklouse in the family Epipsocidae. It is found in North America.

References

Epipsocidae
Insects described in 1930